David Yaffe is the name of:

 David Yaffe (music critic) (born 1973), American music critic and humanities scholar.
 David Yaffe, British Marxian theorist.